Declan Stephen Lambert Lee Kit Meng (born 21 September 1998) is a Malaysian professional footballer who plays as a defender for Malaysia Super League side Kuala Lumpur City and the Malaysia national team.

Lambert was born in Kuala Lumpur, but then moved to Thailand and Australia at a young age. He played youth football with Richmond before starting his senior career with the side. In 2017, Lambert moved to the Netherlands, where he played for the lower division sides Achilles '29 and FC Den Bosch. In February 2022, he returned to his birthplace and signed for Kuala Lumpur City. He has also represented Malaysia at international level, having made his debut for the national team in September 2022.

Early life
Lambert was born in Kuala Lumpur to an English father and Malaysian mother. The family then moved to Thailand, where they stayed for six months before relocating again to Melbourne, Australia.

He has a twin brother, Ryan, who is also a professional footballer. The two played together at Clifton Hill, Richmond, Achilles '29 and FC Den Bosch.

Club career
After playing youth football for FC Clifton Hill and Richmond, Lambert made his senior debut for Richmond aged 17.

In 2018, the Lambert twins moved to Europe, and trialed with sides including Sparta Rotterdam and FC Dordrecht. The pair eventually signed for Dutch Tweede Divisie side Achilles '29. However, they left the club after it suffered relegation at the end of the 2017–18 Tweede Divisie.

The twins then moved to Dutch Eerste Divisie side FC Den Bosch in 2018. Their first-team opportunities were initially limited by the arrival of several other foreign players shortly after their signing. However, Lambert made his debut in the 2019–20 Eerste Divisie and by the 2020–21 Eerste Divisie season, was a regular starter for the side.

On 22 February 2022, Lambert signed for Malaysia Super League side Kuala Lumpur City.

International career 
Lambert was called up to the Malaysia national team for the first time in September 2022. He made his debut on 22 September in a friendly match against Thailand, scoring one of Malaysia's goals in a penalty shoot-out win.

References

External links

Career stats & Profile – Voetbal International

1998 births
Living people
Sportspeople from Kuala Lumpur
Malaysian footballers
Malaysia international footballers
Australian soccer players
Malaysian people of English descent
Malaysian people of Chinese descent
Australian people of English descent
Australian people of Malaysian descent
Malaysian emigrants to Australia
Association football fullbacks
Richmond SC players
Achilles '29 players
FC Den Bosch players
Kuala Lumpur City F.C. players
National Premier Leagues players
Tweede Divisie players
Eerste Divisie players
Malaysia Super League players
Malaysian expatriate footballers
Australian expatriate soccer players
Expatriate footballers in the Netherlands
Australian expatriate sportspeople in the Netherlands
Malaysian expatriate sportspeople in the Netherlands
Twin sportspeople